Live/Hhaï (also known as Magma Live, Live Köhntark, and Hhaï Live) is the first live album and fifth album in total by French rock group Magma. It was recorded in Paris between the 1st and 5 June 1975 at the Taverne de l'Olympia, and was first released in 1975.

The album has been re-released many times: in 1975 on Utopia Records, in 1978 on Tomato Records, 1989 and 2009 on Seventh (the band's own label), 2001 on Victor, and 1996 and 2001 on Charly. Original album is available on one cd and remixed version with two bonus tracks is available as two cd set. 

It is widely regarded as one of the band's seminal releases.

The track titles were slightly altered due to copyright restrictions on the preceding albums. The first two tracks are the title track from Köhntarkösz (1974). "Ëmëhntëht-Rê (Announcement)" and "Hhaï" were eventually incorporated into the complete composition Ëmëhntëhtt-Ré. "Kobah" is a rearranged version of "Kobaïa" from their 1970 debut album. "Lïhns", a previously unreleased track, has yet to be recorded in the studio, but was performed live at the Triton club for their 35th anniversary DVD release, Mythes et Légendes, Volume III, which was released in 2007.  The last two tracks make up the second half of Mekanïk Destruktïw Kommandöh, with "Mëkanïk Zaïn" substituting for "Nebëhr Gudahtt" and "Mekanïk Kommandöh".

Track listing
All music by Christian Vander.

Disc one
 "Köhntark (Part One)" (15:45)
 "Köhntark (Part Two)" (16:14)
 "Ëmëhntëht-Rê (Announcement)" (8:10) (only on the 2CD version)

Disc two
 "Hhaï" (9:20)
 "Kobah" (6:36)
 "Lïhns" (4:55)
 "Da Zeuhl Wortz Mekanïk" (6:14) (only on the 2CD version)
 "Mëkanïk Zaïn" (18:57)

LP track listing

A
 "Köhntark (Part 1)" (15:44)

B
 "Köhntark (Part 2)" (16:16)

C
 "Kobah" (6:23)
 "Lïhns" (5:51)
 "Hhaï" (8:41)

D
 "Mëkanïk Zaïn" (19:17)

Personnel

Musicians
 Klaus Blasquiz – vocals
 Stella Vander – vocals
 Didier Lockwood – violin
 Gabriel Federow – guitar
 Benoit Widemann – keyboards
 Jean-Pol Asseline – keyboards
 Bernard Paganotti – bass
 Christian Vander – drums, vocals

Production
 Christian Vander – inside design
 Frank Owens – engineer
 Georges Besner – inside design
 Giorgio Gomelski – production
 Klaus Blasquiz – ideograms, cover design

References 

1975 live albums
Albums produced by Giorgio Gomelsky
Jazz fusion albums by French artists
Magma (band) albums